Ronald Sayers (born August 29, 1947) is a former American football running back who played in the American Football League (AFL) for the San Diego Chargers in 1969. He played college football for the University of Nebraska Omaha. He is the younger brother of Pro Football Hall of Fame running back Gale Sayers.

References

Living people
1947 births
American football running backs
Nebraska–Omaha Mavericks football players
San Diego Chargers players
Sportspeople from Omaha, Nebraska
Players of American football from Wichita, Kansas
Players of American football from Nebraska
Omaha North High School alumni